Oka Ita is one of the major towns in Ibiono Ibom. It is as well the Headquarters of the Ibiono Ibom local government area, Akwa Ibom State, Nigeria.

Nearby places 

 Ikot Uneke
 Ikpa Ikot Uneke
 Ekput
Ibiatuk  
Ikot Inyang
 Ikot Ntung  
 Atan Akpan Udom  
Urua Abasi
Oil Palm Demo Farm, Ikot Okpoko
Ikot Okpoko
 Ekim 
 Ibiaku Ikot Oku  
Ikot Ekpene  
 Ikot Obong  
Ikot Edung 
 Nkot Mbuk 
Ikot Odiong  
 Ikot Akpan Obong
 Ididep Usuk 
 Ikot Antia 
 Ibiaku Akpa Uton  
Idoro  
 Mbiakpan  
 Itu Ndem  
 Mbak Atan.

References 

Populated places in Akwa Ibom State